Tannenfels may refer to multiple ships:

 Tannenfels (1898)
 Tannenfels (1923)
 Tannenfels (1938)